The Sykkylven Bridge is a concrete bridge that crosses the Sykkylvsfjorden in Sykkylven Municipality in Møre og Romsdal county, Norway.  It connects the municipal center of Aure with the village of Ikornnes on the other side of the fjord.

The Sykkylven Bridge was opened on 14 October 2000. The bridge has 15 spans. It cost , and was paid for by the Ekornes corporation. It is a toll bridge that will have a toll estimated to last until 2016.

See also
List of bridges in Norway
List of bridges in Norway by length
List of bridges
List of bridges by length

References

External links
Sykkylvsbrua website

Sykkylven
Bridges in Møre og Romsdal
Bridges completed in 2000
Toll bridges in Norway